

The Trujillo Peru Temple is a temple of the Church of Jesus Christ of Latter-day Saints (LDS Church).  The temple was completed in 2015 and is in Trujillo, Peru. At the time of its announcement, on 13 December 2008, the temple was expected to be the second in Peru and the 17th in South America. It serves approximately 88,000 members of the church.

History 
The first LDS Church building constructed in Trujillo was dedicated in 1967 by LDS Church president Spencer W. Kimball. The first Trujillo stake was organized in 1978 by Thomas S. Monson. 

Peru's only previous operating temple, which served approximately 114 stakes and districts, was dedicated in Lima by Gordon B. Hinckley in January 1986. Members from Trujillo would travel nine to 10 hours to the Lima Peru Temple. Due to the large number of church members attending in Lima, patrons sometimes waited for hours to participate in ordinance work. These factors contributed to the need for a temple in Trujillo.

When the Trujillo temple was announced, the First Presidency stated, "We are confident that this will be a blessing to the many faithful Saints in this and surrounding areas who have had to travel long distances to enjoy the blessings of the temple. We commend the Saints for their devotion and faithfulness, and are thankful for the blessings that will come to them through the construction of this new temple."

Construction and Dedication
The temple was constructed adjacent to the Campo Eterno cemetery on the Mansiche Highway that leads to Huanchaco. Rafael E. Pino, of the Seventy, presided over a groundbreaking ceremony on 14 September 2011, with an official rendering of the completed building also released.

The building has a classic inspired colonial Spanish architecture accented with a white, green and amber finish. The exterior of Brazilian granite is finished white and "Branco Ceara". The interior finish has a vine motif throughout including the wood, stained glass and much of the granite. The wood of the doors and trim are made of African makore. Most floors and stone ornamentation are made out of Peruvian limestone. 
  
After construction was completed, a public open house was held from 8–30 May 2015, excluding Sundays. Approximately 100,000 people participated in the open house proceedings prior to the building's dedication. In connection with the dedication, a cultural celebration was held in the Coliseo Gran Chimu sports arena on 20 June 2015. The temple was formally dedicated by Dieter F. Uchtdorf on 21 June 2015.

See also

 Comparison of temples of The Church of Jesus Christ of Latter-day Saints
 List of temples of The Church of Jesus Christ of Latter-day Saints
 List of temples of The Church of Jesus Christ of Latter-day Saints by geographic region
 Temple architecture (Latter-day Saints)
 The Church of Jesus Christ of Latter-day Saints in Peru

References

External links
Trujillo Peru Temple Official site
Trujillo Peru Temple at ChurchofJesusChristTemples.org

21st-century Latter Day Saint temples
Buildings and structures in Trujillo, Peru
Temples (LDS Church) in Peru
Religious buildings and structures completed in 2015
2015 establishments in Peru
2015 in Christianity